Ole is a Danish and Norwegian masculine given name, derived from the Old Norse name Óláfr, meaning "ancestor's descendant".

Notable people with the given name include:

Given name
 Ole Anderson, American wrestler
 Ole Andreas Halvorsen, Norwegian hedge fund manager
 Ole Barman, Norwegian novelist
 Ole Einar Bjørndalen, Norwegian biathlete
 Ole Barndorff-Nielsen, Danish mathematician
 Ole Beich, Danish bassist
 Ole E. Benson, American politician
 Ole Bornedal, Danish film director
 Ole Bull, Norwegian violinist
 Ole Kirk Christiansen, Danish businessman, founder of the Lego Group
 Ole Ernst, Danish actor
 Ole Espersen, Danish politician
 Ole Evinrude, Norwegian-born American outboard manufacturer
 Ole Gunnar Solskjær, Norwegian footballer
 Ole Bjørn Kraft, Danish journalist and politician
 Ole Lund Kirkegaard, Danish author
 Ole Monty, Danish actor
 Ole Nydahl, Danish founder and director of Diamond Way
 Ole Olsen (filmmaker) (1863–1943), Danish filmmaker, founder of Nordisk Film
 Ole Olsen (speedway rider), Danish speedway rider
 Ole Birk Olesen (born 1972), Danish politician
 Ole Qvist, Danish goalkeeper
 Ole Ritter, Danish racing cyclist
 Ole Rømer, Danish astronomer
 Ole O. Sageng, American politician
 Ole Stavad, Danish politician
 Ole Svendsen, Danish boxer
 Ole Worm, Danish physician and antiquary

Surname
 Eduard Ole (1898–1995), Estonian painter

See also
 Ola (given name)

References

 Yonge, Charlotte Mary (1863). History of Christian Names, Volume 1. London: Parker, Son, and Bourn. Via Google Books.
 Behind the Name

Danish masculine given names
Given names
Masculine given names
Norwegian masculine given names